Swffryd (or Sofrydd) is a Welsh community on the boundary of  Blaenau Gwent County Borough Council.

Geography 
The Ebbw River flows past the west of the village.

The B4471 and A472 runs near to the village. The population of the community is 5,947 including the whole ward of Crumlin.

Most of the site was built as local authority houses to house the mining population. Lewis Street, Rectory Road and other parts in the west of the village have older houses and buildings.

Remains of the Crumlin Viaduct can still be seen in Swffryd / Sofrydd and can be seen in full view from neighbouring Crumlin just off Lewis Street at the top of the embankment.

Politics 
The Llanhilleth electoral ward serves the village. The ward is represented by Councillors Norman Lee Parsons (Llanhilleth, Ind), Hedley McCarthy (Llanhilleth, Lab), and Joanne Collins (Llanhilleth, Ind).

The area is represented in the Senedd by Alun Davies (Labour) and the Member of Parliament is Nick Smith (Labour).

Transport 
It is also a 48-minute  walk to Newbridge railway station. Both stations provide hourly trains from Ebbw Vale to Cardiff Central, and in 2021, to Newport.

The town is served by the bus stops on the B4471 at Sofrydd Schools and Walters Avenue stops, with connections to Stagecoach South Wales services:

 21 (Cwmbran-Blackwood/Pontypool)
 62 (Ebbw Vale-Cwmbran)
 X15 (Newport-Brynmawr)
 X1 (Cwmbran-Brynmawr and Pontypool)
 95A (Abertillery)
 95B (Newbridge)
 95C (Aberbeeg)

References

External links
 Heritage page for Crumlin Viaduct
Llanhilleth and Swffryd heritage page at Industrial Gwent

Villages in Blaenau Gwent